Megalofrea is a genus of longhorn beetles of the subfamily Lamiinae.

 Megalofrea bioculata (Fairmaire, 1889)
 Megalofrea cinerascens (Fairmaire, 1901)
 Megalofrea decorsei (Fairmaire, 1901)
 Megalofrea humeralis (Vollehoven, 1869)
 Megalofrea sparsuticollis (Fairmaire, 1897)

References

Crossotini